The 2011 International Rules Series (officially the 2011 Toyota International Rules Series) was the 16th International Rules Series contested between Gaelic footballers from Ireland and Australian rules footballers from Australia. The series was played over two test matches, with Ireland winning the series by 130-65 points on aggregate. In doing so, Ireland achieved their greatest ever winning test margin (in the first test) and greatest ever series victory, whilst Australia had their lowest ever test score in the second test. The Australian Football League (AFL)  announced part of the schedule for the series in June 2011, with Etihad Stadium in Melbourne chosen for the first test match. In July, the AFL announced that Metricon Stadium on the Gold Coast would be the venue for the second test. This was the first time that any stadium in the state of Queensland hosted an international rules game. The first test was played on 28 October, while the second test was played one week later on 4 November.

Broadcast
Network Ten and its multi-channel affiliate One HD broadcast this year's series to Australian audiences. The first test match was delayed in all metropolitan areas of Australia, while the second test was broadcast live to Melbourne and Sydney audiences and delayed elsewhere. Irish-language channel TG4 broadcast the series live in Ireland, while mainstream English-language network RTÉ showed an hourly highlights show as was the case for the 2010 series in Ireland.

Background

Irish team
Former Derry Gaelic footballer Anthony Tohill returned as Ireland manager after the series loss in 2010. He was joined on the coaching and selection staff by Eoin Liston (Kerry), Kevin O'Brien (Wicklow), Seán Óg de Paor (Galway) and Kieran McGeeney (Armagh), all former international rules players. On 12 October, Tohill named 18 players of a 23-man squad (later to become 24) and also confirmed, subject to club commitments, that Stephen Cluxton would be the Ireland captain. Four further players were named on 15 October. Current Sydney Swans player Tommy Walsh joined the squad as the last selected player, while Donegal footballer Karl Lacey replaced Darren O'Sullivan in the selected squad due to the latter's club commitments. Doubts remained over the availability of several other players due to club football commitments. However, few changes were necessary as Patrick Kelly of Cork was called up to complete the 24 man squad.

Australian team
Former Western Bulldogs coach Rodney Eade was named as coach and manager of the Australian team in March. He is joined on the coaching staff by former Richmond footballer Wayne Campbell (selector), as well as former players Andrew McLeod and Brad Johnson, while Collingwood sports science director David Buttifant will be in charge of the team's preparation for the series. The Australian team was announced on 13 October minus an announced captain or leadership squad. The team is made up of talented young players aged around 20–24, yet only four players (David Wojcinski, Stephen Milne, Brad Green and James Frawley) have any prior senior international rules experience. Melbourne footballer Colin Sylvia was initially selected in the team, but was withdrawn due to inappropriate off-field behavior, diminishing the Australian squad to 23.

Brad Green, the captain of the Melbourne Football Club, was announced as the captain of Australia on 25 October. The announcement was leaked via Max Gawn on Twitter before the official AFL announcement was made. James Kelly, Andrew Swallow and James Frawley were all named as vice-captains.

Squads

**These players replaced other players initially selected in the squad who withdrew from the series due to club football commitments

The following players withdrew from the series: Darran O'Sullivan (Kerry - GAA), Colin Sylvia (Melbourne - AFL)

† Jake King was injured in the first test and was replaced for the second test by Joel Patfull

Matches

The opening test of the series was played at Melbourne's Etihad Stadium, the second time the venue had hosted an international rules game, the previous match occurring in 2005. In front of a rather disappointing crowd of 22,921, Ireland outclassed their Australian opponents by a record 44 point margin. The margin was the greatest in the history of the series, eclipsing the 38 point win Australian win in the second test of the 2006 Series. Ireland's score of 80 points was also the biggest Irish score in the history of the series, whilst Australia's 36 points was the lowest Australian score since 1990.

Ireland skipped away to a quick lead, scoring 4 'overs' and 1 goal before Australia managed a major score. Leading by 18 points at the first break, Ireland increased their lead in the second quarter and dominated Australia in general possession. The home side were fortunate to receive their first goal of the series, with captain Brad Green making the most of an uncharacteristic error from Irish skipper and goalkeeper Stephen Cluxton. The third quarter briefly erupted with a spotfire as Ireland's Kevin Reilly approached the Australian huddle after a break in play as a result of a concussion to Emmet Bolton. The ensuing fight was largely harmless and no player was reported or sent off. Australia failed to threaten despite some improved possession in the midfield, as Ireland scored 5 overs to 1 in the quarter. The fourth quarter showcased some more classic Irish skill, with goals to Leighton Glynn and Kieran Donaghy extending the margin into record territory.

Ireland manager Anthony Tohill stated post-match that the experience of Ireland's AFL players was "huge" and instrumental in the win, whilst his opposite number Rodney Eade lamented his side's lack of physicality, stating that the Australians were "too nice" in attempting to maintain the spirit of the game. He praised the "sensational kicking skills" of the Irish team and promised a more physical Australian side for the second test.

Jake King of Australia was ruled out prior the second test with a knee injury that would also disrupt his pre-season training for Richmond. Brisbane Lions footballer Joel Patfull replaced him in the side Another disappointing crowd of 12,545 attended the match, making the cumulative crowd of approximately 35,000 one of the lowest in series history. Ireland were far superior for the duration of the match, leading at every quarter and pulling away thanks to a clever goal from Leighton Glynn in the second quarter.

Trailing by 11 points at half time, Australia managed just one over for the rest of the match, as Ireland's superior finishing skills proved decisive again. The third quarter descended into virtual madness however, with several minor fights and scuffles very nearly turning into genuine brawls. In total, five players were yellow carded (sent off for 10 minutes) in a spiteful third quarter. Ireland rapped up the test in the last quarter, finishing with three overs to one and recording a 21-point test match win, and a 65-point series victory (130-65 on aggregate).

Whilst continual speculation remained over the immediate future of the series, on account of supposed Australian apathy in terms of crowd attendance and player interest, GAA director general Paraic Duffy announced that the series would resume as planned in the years 2013 and 2014. In relation to this series however, Geelong premiership midfielder James Kelly was awarded the Jim Stynes Medal for being Australia's best player, whilst dual All-Ireland and AFL Premiership medallist Tadhg Kennelly won the GAA Medal for being the Irish player of the series.

See also
 International rules football
 Gaelic football
 Australian rules football
 Comparison of Australian rules football and Gaelic football

References

International Rules series
International Rules Series
International Rules series
International sports competitions hosted by Australia
Sports competitions on the Gold Coast, Queensland